Urbandale Community School District is a school district headquartered in Urbandale, Iowa.

It serves a portion of the Urbandale city limits, and is entirely in Polk County.

In January 2018 the district presented a plan to replace four elementary schools built in the 1950s and 1960s-Jensen, Olmsted, Rolling Green and Valerius-with two new buildings.

Schools
Secondary schools:
 Urbandale High School
 Urbandale Middle School

Primary schools:
 Jensen Elementary School
 Karen Acres Elementary School
 Olmsted Elementary School
 Rolling Green Elementary School
 Valerius Elementary School
 Webster Elementary School

Preschools:
 AdventureTime

Other:
 Metro West Learning Academy

See also
List of school districts in Iowa

References

External links
 Urbandale Community School District
 
School districts in Iowa
Education in Polk County, Iowa
Urbandale, Iowa